Yazid ibn Abi Sufyan ibn Harb ibn Umayya (died 639) was a leading Arab Muslim commander in the conquest of Syria from 634 until his death in the plague of Amwas in 639. Following the capture of Damascus around 635, he was placed in command of the city and its military district. After the death of the overall Muslim commander of Syria, Abu Ubayda ibn al-Jarrah, in 639, he was appointed by Caliph Umar the governor of Damascus, Jordan and Palestine.

Yazid was the elder half-brother of Mu'awiya ibn Abi Sufyan, who was appointed as his successor over Damascus and Jordan by Umar and gradually became governor over all of Syria. In 661 he became caliph and founded the Syria-based Umayyad dynasty.

Early life

Yazid was a son of Abu Sufyan, a chief of the Quraysh tribe of Mecca, belonging to the Umayya branch of its Banu Abd Shams clan. His mother was Zaynab bint Nawfal (also identified as Zaynab bint Hashim) of the Kinana tribe. He embraced Islam with his father and paternal half-brother Mu'awiya when the Islamic prophet Muhammad captured Mecca in 630.

Soon afterward, he fought with the Muslims against the Thaqif tribe and its nomadic allies at the Battle of Hunayn. He was among the Qurayshites who the Islamic prophet won over through his generosity, in his case receiving a present of one hundred camels and forty ounces of silver.

Yazid was married to Fakhita, a daughter of Muhammad's close companion Abd al-Rahman ibn Awf.

Commander and governor in Syria
Yazid was appointed by Caliph Abu Bakr one of the main commanders of the Muslim conquest of Byzantine Syria, launched in 633 or 634. Yazid and his men, who numbered between 3,000 and 7,500 according to the sources, were initially dispatched to the Balqa region east and northeast of the Dead Sea.

In May 634 Yazid and the other main commanders, including Amr ibn al-As, Shurahbil ibn Hasana and Khalid ibn al-Walid, besieged and captured Bosra, the first major Byzantine town to fall to the Muslims in Syria. After their major victory against the Byzantines at the Battle of Ajnadayn, during which Yazid acted as lieutenant commander, he launched further operations in the Balqa. Among these was the capture of the Amman fort in 635.

Yazid took part in the siege of Damascus, beginning in 634. Following the fall of city in 635, or later in 637, Yazid became the deputy governor of Damascus under Abu Ubayda ibn al-Jarrah's overall command over the Muslims in Syria. From Damascus, according to some of the early Muslim sources, Yazid dispatched lieutenant commanders against various places, including Dihya ibn Khalifa of the Banu Kalb to Palmyra in the desert to the northeast and a certain Zahra of the Banu Qushayr to the Batanea plain in the Hauran region south of Damascus; the defenders of both places capitulated after negotiations. He later left Damascus to confront a Byzantine force led by a patrician, Theodore, sent by the Byzantine emperor Heraclius to recapture the city. Yazid was reinforced by Khalid and the Byzantines were defeated.

In the Battle of the Yarmuk in 636, where the Muslims scored a decisive victory against the Byzantines, which consolidated and extended their conquest of much of Syria, Yazid was one of the four principal Muslim field commanders. He and Mu'awiya also launched operations against the Syrian littoral, capturing the Mediterranean port towns of Sidon, Beirut and Byblos.

When Abu Ubayda died in the plague of Amwas in 639, Yazid was appointed by Caliph Umar as the governor of Damascus, Jordan and Palestine. The plague had afflicted much of Syria and took an enormous toll on the Muslim troops there. Later in 639, Yazid succumbed to the plague as well. He did not leave any children. Umar appointed Mu'awiya in his brother's place over Damascus and Jordan.

Image
Yazid is referred to in later Islamic sources as 'Yazid al-Khayr' (Yazid the Good) because of his positively viewed role in the Syrian conquest. Because of the nature of his death during a state of war he is considered by these sources to be a shahid (martyr).

See also
Companions of prophet Muhammad

References

Bibliography
 

 
 

639 deaths
Year of birth missing
Arab people of the Arab–Byzantine wars
7th-century deaths from plague (disease)
Banu Umayya
Companions of the Prophet
People of the Muslim conquest of the Levant
Rashidun governors of Syria